Deirdre Sheehan (born 25 September 1957) is an Irish former swimmer. She competed in three events at the 1976 Summer Olympics.

References

External links
 

1957 births
Living people
Irish female swimmers
Olympic swimmers of Ireland
Swimmers at the 1976 Summer Olympics
Place of birth missing (living people)